Greg Howard (born 1964) is a Chapman Stick player based in Charlottesville, Virginia. Howard played saxophone and keyboards in area bands before switching to Stick in 1985. An early recording with guitarist Tim Reynolds was released on cassette in 1987 as Sticks and Stones.

Howard played with the Dave Matthews Band on two albums (Remember Two Things, 1993, and Before These Crowded Streets, 1998) and has performed with the band in concert. He also collaborated with Dave Matthews Band saxophonist LeRoi Moore on various projects.

In 2000, the Greg Howard Band (with Dutch musicians Jan van Olffen, Jan Wolfkamp, and Hubert Heeringa) released an album, Lift.

Howard performs and leads Chapman Stick seminars in North America and Europe. He has also written two method books: The Stick Book, Volume One, 1997, and The Greg Howard Songbook, 2009, as well as an instructional DVD for the Stick, Basic Free Hands Technique DVD, released in 2011.

Discography

Studio releases
Sticks and Stones: A Collection of Spontaneous Improvisations, 2001 (cassette 1987)
Collaboration with Tim Reynolds, electric guitar
Stick Figures, 1993, remastered and re-released in 1999
Shapes, 1994
Code Magenta, 1995 with Dawn Thompson, vocals; LeRoi Moore, saxophone 
Sticks and Stones: Transmigration, 1996 with Tim Reynolds, guitar and other, remastered 2005.
Sol, 1997 with Tim Reynolds, guitar; John D'earth, trumpet; others 
Water on the Moon, 1998
Lift, 2000 with the Greg Howard Band
Ether Ore, 2005
AZUL, 2013 with John D'earth and Brian Caputo
The Holly and the Ivy, 2017 with Angela Kelly

Gear

Chapman Stick 
Rosewood 10-string (1995)
Standard SE Stickup
Baritone Melody/Standard Bass tuning
Paduak 12-string (2000)
"The Block" pickup
Matched Reciprocal tuning

Rack 
Lexicon MPX-G2 (Stick melody)
Rane SP-13 (pre-amp melody, mix all)
TC Electronic Fireworx (Stick bass)
Boss VF-1/Boss SE-70 (bass/melody)
SWR SM-400 (preamp bass, power all)

Pedals 
double switch for Fireworx
volume pedal for bass side (Fireworx)
Lexicon MPX-R1
Shape Shifter(TM) (MIDI pressure pad)
Boss FC-50 MIDI control for SE-70
two on/off switches for SE-70
volume pedal for melody side (SE-70)
expression pedal for Fireworx

Other 
The Stick Book, Volume I

References

External links 
 
 

1964 births
Living people
Chapman Stick players
American jazz musicians